Canada and the United States have played each other a total of 65 times, with Canada winning 39, the United States winning 24, and only two draws. Historically Canada have dominated the rivalry, however since 2014, the results have been in favor of USA where they won the same amount of games in a 6 year period as they had the previous 37 years.

The first ever match was contested in 1977 at Swangard Stadium in Burnaby, British Columbia, Canada. Canada won the match 17–6. The United States' first win came the following year where they won 12–7.

Since their first match in 1977, the United States and Canada play every year taking it in turns as the home side. In recent years they play on a home and away basis so that both teams are at home during their meetings, although many of the home and away meetings are the qualification rounds for the Rugby World Cup.

From 2013 to 2015, Canada and the United States played every June in the tournament now known as the World Rugby Nations Cup, along with Japan, Fiji, Tonga, and Samoa. Since 2016, the two countries have played in the Americas Rugby Championship alongside the senior teams of Brazil, Chile, and Uruguay, plus Argentina's second national side, Argentina XV.

Defunct tournaments
In 1996, Canada and United States played in the Pacific-Rim Championship along with Hong Kong and Japan until the addition of Fiji, Samoa and Tonga in 1999. The tournament was ceased in 2000. Alongside the Pacific-Rim Championship, the Pan-American Championship was also competed which included the United States and Canada. Like the Pacific-Rim Championship the tournament was ceased in 2003.

In 2003 the Super Cup was formed and was contested between Japan, Russia and the United States. In 2004 they were joined by Canada. The tournament was only contested for 3 years as it was ceased in 2005 with Canada the final champions. Also in 2003, the Churchill Cup was formed where Canada and the United States would play A sides from Europe and the Southern Hemisphere. The tournament was ceased in 2011 before the 2011 Rugby World Cup.

Summary

Overview

Records
Note: Date shown in brackets indicates when the record was or last set.

Results

See also
 Rugby Americas North
 Americas Rugby Championship
 Rugby World Cup qualification

References

Canada national rugby union team matches
United States national rugby union team matches
Rugby union rivalries
Rugby union
Rugby union